Mercury(I) oxide, also known as mercurous oxide, is an inorganic metal oxide with the chemical formula Hg2O.

It is a brown/black powder, insoluble in water but soluble in nitric acid. With hydrochloric acid, it reacts to form calomel, Hg2Cl2. Mercury(I) oxide is toxic but without taste or smell. It is chemically unstable and converts to mercury(II) oxide and mercury metal.

References

Oxides
Mercury(I) compounds
Inorganic compounds